To the nines is an idiom meaning "to perfection" or "to the highest degree".

To the nines may also refer to:
To the Nines (Only Crime album)
To the Nines (Hatesphere album)
To the Nines (novel), a 2003 Janet Evanovich novel